Dole may refer to:

Places
 Dole, Ceredigion, Wales
 Dole, Idrija, Slovenia
 Dole, Jura, France
 Arrondissement of Dole
 Dole (Kladanj), a village at the entity line of Federation of Bosnia and Herzegovina-Republika Srpska
 Dole, Ljubuški, Bosnia and Herzegovina
 Dole, Metlika, southeastern Slovenia
 Dole, Nepal
 Dole, Šentjur, eastern Slovenia
 La Dôle, a mountain in Switzerland

Other uses
 Dole (surname), including a list of people with the name
 Dole Constituency, a parliamentary constituency in Zanzibar
 Dole Food Company, a US agricultural corporation
 Unemployment benefits
 Welfare
 Cura Annonae, Roman subsidized grain supply
 Charity (practice), giving food, clothing or money in England (mostly obsolete); examples include
 Department of Labor and Employment (Philippines)
 Dole Air Race, ill-fated 1927 air race

See also
 
 Dhole
 Dhol
 Dule (disambiguation)